is a Japanese voice actor. His most notable role was playing Hayato Gokudera in Reborn!.

Filmography

Anime

Video games

Tokusatsu

References

External links 
 
 
 Hidekazu Ichinose at GamePlaza-Haruka- Voice Artist DataBase 
 

1977 births
Living people
Japanese male voice actors